ISO/IEC JTC 1/SC 32 Data management and interchange is a standardization subcommittee of the Joint Technical Committee ISO/IEC JTC 1 of the International Organization for Standardization (ISO) and the International Electrotechnical Commission (IEC), which develops and facilitates standards within the field of data management and interchange. The international secretariat of ISO/IEC JTC 1/SC 32 is the American National Standards Institute (ANSI) located in the United States.

History
ISO/IEC JTC 1/SC 32 was formed in 1997, as a combination of the following three ISO/IEC JTC 1 subgroups: ISO/IEC JTC 1/SC 21/WG 3, Database; ISO/IEC JTC 1/SC 14, Data elements; and ISO/IEC JTC 1/SC 30, Open-edi. The new subcommittee was established with the intention of developing, and facilitating the development of, standards for data management within local and distributed information system environments. ISO/IEC JTC 1/SC 32 was originally made up of five working groups (WGs). ISO/IEC JTC 1/SC 32/WG 5, Database access and interchange, was disbanded in March 2002. WG 4, SQL multimedia and application packages, was disbanded in May, 2018.  The three other original working groups of the subcommittee are currently active, although the title of ISO/IEC JTC 1/SC 32/WG 1 was changed from Open-edi to its current title, e-Business.  A new working group, WG 6 Data usage, was added in 2020.

Scope
The scope of ISO/IEC JTC 1/SC 32 is “Standards for data management within and among local and distributed information systems environments. SC 32 provides enabling technologies to promote harmonization of data management facilities across sector-specific areas. Specifically, SC32 standards include:”
 Reference models and frameworks for the coordination of existing and emerging standards
 Definition of data domains, data types, and data structures, and their associated semantics
 Languages, services, and protocols for persistent storage, concurrent access and concurrent update, and interchange of data
 Methods, languages, services, and protocols to structure, organize, and register metadata and other information resources associated with sharing and interoperability, including electronic commerce

Structure
ISO/IEC JTC 1/SC 32 is made up of four active working groups, each of which carries out specific tasks in standards development within the field of data management and interchange. As a response to changing standardization needs, working groups of ISO/IEC JTC 1/SC 32 can be disbanded if their area of work is no longer applicable, or established if new working areas arise. The focus of each working group is described in the group’s terms of reference. Active working groups of ISO/IEC JTC 1/SC 32 are:

Collaborations
ISO/IEC JTC 1/SC 32 works in close collaboration with a number of other organizations or subcommittees, both internal and external to ISO or IEC, in order to avoid conflicting or duplicative work. Organizations internal to ISO or IEC that collaborate with or are in liaison to ISO/IEC JTC 1/SC 32 include:
 ISO/IEC JTC 1/SC 7, Software and systems engineering
 ISO/IEC JTC 1/SC 25, Interconnection of information technology equipment
 ISO/IEC JTC 1/SC 38, Cloud Computing and Distributed Platforms
 ISO/TC 12, Quantities and units
 ISO/TC 37, Terminology and other language and content resources 
 ISO/TC 37/SC 2, Terminographical and lexicographical working methods
 ISO/TC 37/SC 3, Systems to manage terminology, knowledge and content
 ISO/TC 37/SC 4, Language resource management
 ISO/TC 46/SC 4, Technical interoperability
 ISO/TC 46/SC 11, Archives/records management
 ISO/TC 68/SC 2, Financial Services, security
 ISO/TC 127, Earth-moving machinery
 ISO/TC 154, Processes, data elements and documents in commerce, industry and administration
 ISO/TC 184, Automation systems and integration
 ISO/TC 184/SC 4, Industrial data
 ISO/TC 204, Intelligent transport systems
 ISO/TC 211, Geographic information/Geomatics
 ISO/TC 215, Health informatics
 ISO/TC 232, Learning services outside formal education

Some organizations external to ISO or IEC that collaborate with or are in liaison to ISO/IEC JTC 1/SC 32 include:
 International Confederation of Societies of Authors and Composers (CISAC)
 Dublin Core Metadata Initiative (DCMI)
 EUROSTAT
 International Telecommunications Satellite Organization (ITSO)
 ITU
 Infoterm
 Object Management Group (OMG)
 Society for Worldwide Interbank Financial Telecommunication (SWIFT)
 UN/CEFACT
 United Nations Economic Commission for Europe (UNECE)
 World Meteorological Organization (WMO)
 W3C

Member countries
Countries pay a fee to ISO to be members of subcommittees.

The 14 "P" (participating) members of ISO/IEC JTC 1/SC 32 are: Canada, China, Czech Republic, Côte d'Ivoire, Egypt, Finland, Germany, India, Japan, Republic of Korea, Portugal, Russian Federation, United Kingdom, and United States.

The 22 "O" (observing) members of ISO/IEC JTC 1/SC 32 are: Australia, Austria, Belgium, Bosnia and Herzegovina, France, Ghana, Hungary, Iceland, Indonesia, Islamic Republic of Iran, Ireland, Italy, Kazakhstan, Luxembourg, Netherlands, Norway, Poland, Romania, Serbia, Spain, Switzerland, and Turkey.

Published standards
ISO/IEC JTC 1/SC 32 standards are meant to structure, organize, and register metadata and other information resources associated with sharing and interoperability, including electronic commerce. ISO/IEC JTC 1/SC 32 currently has 74 published standards within the field of data management and interchange, including:

SQL 
The committee is responsible for the SQL standard, which has seen eight revisions since its initial publication in 1986. As of 2021, the most recent update is SQL:2016.

See also
 ISO/IEC JTC 1
 List of ISO standards
 American National Standards Institute
 International Organization for Standardization
 International Electrotechnical Commission

References

External links 
 ISO/IEC JTC 1/SC 32 page at ISO

032
Data management
Data interchange standards